| top point scorer         =  Emily Scarratt (39)
| top try scorer           =  Laure Sansus (6)
| Player of the tournament =  Laure Sansus
| website                  = 
| previous year            = 2021
| previous tournament      = 2021 Women's Six Nations Championship
| next year                = 2023
| next tournament          = 2023 Women's Six Nations Championship
| triple crown             =  (22nd title)
}}
The 2022 Women's Six Nations Championship, known as the TikTok Women's Six Nations for marketing purposes, was the 21st series of the Women's Six Nations Championship, an annual women's rugby union competition between England, France, Ireland, Italy, Scotland and Wales. It was held from 26 March to 30 April 2022.

England entered the tournament as defending champions, having won the abridged version of the competition held in 2021.

England defeated France in the final round of the tournament to secure their 18th title and their 16th Grand Slam.

Format
The 2022 competition saw the tournament return to its traditional format, with each participating country playing each other once, following the COVID disrupted tournament that took place in 2021. However the tournament retained its later starting date, which saw it begin after the conclusion of the men's competition.

Participants

Squads

Table

Table ranking rules
 Four points are awarded for a win.
 Two points are awarded for a draw.
 A bonus point is awarded to a team that scores four or more tries, or loses by seven points or fewer. If a team scores four or more tries, and loses by seven points or fewer, they are awarded both bonus points.
 Three bonus points are awarded to a team that wins all five of their matches (a Grand Slam). This ensures that a Grand Slam winning team would top the table with at least 23 points, as another team could lose one match while winning two bonus points and win the other four matches while winning four bonus points for a maximum of 22 points.
 Tiebreakers
 If two or more teams are tied on table points, the team with the better points difference (points scored less points conceded) is ranked higher.
 If the above tiebreaker fails to separate tied teams, the team that scores the higher number of total tries (including penalty tries) in their matches is ranked higher.
 If two or more teams remain tied after applying the above tiebreakers then those teams will be placed at equal rank; if the tournament has concluded and more than one team is placed first then the title will be shared between them.

Fixtures

Round 1

Notes:
 Meryl Smith (Scotland) and Emma Sing (England) made their international debuts.

Notes:
Aoibheann Reilly and Anna McGann (both Ireland) and Sisilia Tuipulotu (Wales) made their international debuts

Notes:
 Assia Khalfaoui (France) and Alessandra Frangipani and Emanuela Stecca (Italy) made their international debuts

Round 2

Notes:
 Christy Haney (Ireland) made their international debut.

|attendance = 4,875

Notes:
 Emma Orr (Scotland) made their international debut.

Notes:
 Kat Roche was originally scheduled to referee the match but was replaced by Hollie Davidson prior to kick-off. Davidson was originally named as assistant referee for the fixture.
 Francesca Barro (Italy) made their international debut.

Round 3

Notes:
 The crowd of 14,689 was a record for an England ticketed home game.

Notes:
 The Italian team suffered a COVID outbreak while preparing for the match and underwent the following changes:
Giordana Duca was replaced by Valeria Fedrighi, Michela Sillari was replaced by Alyssa D'Incà and Aura Muzzo was replaced by Manuela Furlan. Furlan was in turn replaced by Vittoria Ostuni Minuzzi

On the bench Michela Merlo was replaced by Emanuela Stecca, Fedrighi was replaced by Alessia Margotti, D'Incà was replaced by Beatrice Capomaggi and Minuzzi was replaced by Federica Cipolla.

 Aoife Wafer (Ireland) and Alessia Margotti (Italy) made their international debuts.

Round 4 

Notes:
 Elisa Giordano was originally named at number 8 for Italy, but was replaced by Ilaria Arrighetti prior to kickoff. Arrighetti, who was originally named at openside flanker, was replaced by Isabella Locatelli. Locatelli's place on the bench was taken by Alessandra Frangipani.

Notes:
 Molly Scuffil-McCabe and Niamh Byrne (Ireland) made their international debuts
 The attendance of 15,863 broke the record for the largest attendance at a ticketed England home game. The previous attendance record was set in Gloucester in round 3.

Round 5

Notes:
 With this win England won their 18th Women's Six Nations title and their 16th grand slam.
 This was England's 23rd consecutive win, tying their own record for the most consecutive wins by a senior international side.

Notes:
 Vicky Irwin (Ireland) made their international debut

Player statistics

Most points

Most tries

Broadcast

References

Women
2022
2022 rugby union tournaments for national teams
2021–22 in Irish rugby union
2021–22 in English rugby union
2021–22 in Welsh rugby union
2021–22 in Scottish rugby union
2021–22 in French rugby union
2021–22 in Italian rugby union
2021–22 in European women's rugby union
2022 in English women's sport
2022 in French women's sport
2022 in Italian women's sport
2022 in Irish women's sport
2022 in Scottish women's sport
2022 in Welsh women's sport
March 2022 sports events in Europe
March 2022 sports events in the United Kingdom
April 2022 sports events in Europe
April 2022 sports events in the United Kingdom